Gozuiyeh-ye Olya (also Romanized as Gozū’īyeh-ye ‘Olyā; also known as Gazū’īyeh and Gozū’īyeh) is a village in Javaran Rural District, Hanza District, Rabor County, Kerman Province, Iran. At the 2006 census, its population was 120, in 20 families.

References 

Populated places in Rabor County